Danoa is a town in the far northeast of Ivory Coast, adjacent to the border with Burkina Faso. It is a sub-prefecture of Doropo Department in Bounkani Region, Zanzan District.

Danoa was a commune until March 2012, when it became one of 1126 communes nationwide that were abolished.
In 2014, the population of the sub-prefecture of Tagadi was 34,440.

Villages
The seven villages of the sub-prefecture of Tagadi and their population in 2014 are:

Notes

Sub-prefectures of Bounkani
Former communes of Ivory Coast